Shin Saw Gyi was a chief queen consort of King Swa Saw Ke of Ava. She was also a principal queen of kings Kyawswa II of Pinya and Narathu of Pinya. She was a granddaughter of King Saw Yun, the founder of Sagaing Kingdom, and a sister of King Thado Minbya, the founder of Ava Kingdom. She was originally a queen consort of Swa, and was given the title of Queen of the Northern Palace and Pinya in fief. She became the chief queen after Queen Khame Mi died, and became the Queen of the Southern Palace.

The queen may also be the mother of King Tarabya, the successor of Swa. The Yazawin Thit chronicle, citing a contemporary inscription, states that Tarabya was also a child of Shin Saw Gyi. But the Hmannan Yazawin chronicle rejects it anyway, saying that it was contrary to the reporting by previous chronicles. Hmannan recognizes only two children by her, Saw Myat Ke and Saw Swe Hnit.

Ancestry
The following is her ancestry according to Hmannan. She was descended from Pagan and Pinya royalty. Her paternal side is unreported except that her father was of the Tagaung royal line.

Notes

References

Bibliography
 
 
 

Chief queens consort of Ava
Queens consort of Ava
14th-century Burmese women
15th-century Burmese women